Glaucoclystis azumai is a moth in the family Geometridae. It is found in Japan (Ryukyu Islands).

The wingspan is about 23 mm.

References

Moths described in 1971
Eupitheciini
Moths of Japan